"You and Your Sweet Love" is a song written by Bill Anderson and recorded by American country music artist Connie Smith. Released in October 1969, the song reached number 6 on the Billboard Hot Country Singles chart. The single was later released on Smith's 1970 compilation album The Best of Connie Smith, Vol. 2. The song was additionally issued on Smith's studio album I Never Once Stopped Loving You that same year.

Chart performance

References

1969 singles
Connie Smith songs
Songs written by Bill Anderson (singer)
Song recordings produced by Bob Ferguson (musician)
1969 songs
RCA Victor singles